Stachys coccinea, the scarlet hedgenettle or Texas betony, is an ornamental plant of the family Lamiaceae, which is native from Arizona to Texas and from Baja California Sur, Mexico to Nicaragua.

Some cultivars of this species include:

References

External links
 Stachys coccinea

coccinea
Flora of the Southwestern United States
Flora of the South-Central United States
Flora of Mexico
Flora of Central America
Flora without expected TNC conservation status